Pervomaysky is a rural locality (a khutor) in Naumovsky Selsoviet Rural Settlement, Konyshyovsky District, Kursk Oblast, Russia. Population:

Geography 
The khutor is located on the Svapa River (a right tributary of the Seym River), 43 km from the Russia–Ukraine border, 83 km north-west of Kursk, 21 km north-west of the district center – the urban-type settlement Konyshyovka, 10 km from the selsoviet center – Naumovka.

 Climate
Pervomaysky has a warm-summer humid continental climate (Dfb in the Köppen climate classification).

Transport 
Pervomaysky is located 36 km from the federal route  Ukraine Highway, 58 km from the route  Crimea Highway, 20.5 km from the route  (Trosna – M3 highway), 18 km from the road of regional importance  (Fatezh – Dmitriyev), 21 km from the road  (Konyshyovka – Zhigayevo – 38K-038), 4.5 km from the road  (Dmitriyev – Beryoza – Menshikovo – Khomutovka), on the road of intermunicipal significance  (Makaro-Petrovskoye – Pervomaysky), 12 km from the nearest railway halt 536 km (railway line Navlya – Lgov-Kiyevsky).

The rural locality is situated 90 km from Kursk Vostochny Airport, 178 km from Belgorod International Airport and 290 km from Voronezh Peter the Great Airport.

References

Notes

Sources

Rural localities in Konyshyovsky District